Ponent, Lleida or Terres de Lleida is one of the seven territories defined by the Regional Plan of Catalonia. It is not clear what name will have, being all of them traditionally accepted names for the region.

It is located in the westernmost part of Catalonia, around the city of Lleida, its administrative capital and most populated municipality, and will be formed by five existing comarques: Segrià, Noguera, Pla d'Urgell, Urgell, Segarra and Garrigues.

References

Geography of Catalonia
Functional territorial sections of Catalonia